There are no extant representations of the Buddha represented in artistic form until roughly the 2nd century CE, probably due to the prominence of aniconism in Buddhism in the earliest extant period of Buddhist devotional statuary and bas reliefs. A number of early discourses describe the appearance of the Buddha, and are believed to have served as a model for early depictions. In particular, the "32 signs of a Great Man" are described throughout the Pali Canon, and these are believed to have formed the basis for early representations of the Buddha. These 32 major characteristics are also supplemented by another 80 secondary characteristics (Pali:Anubyanjana).

In Mahāyāna Buddhism, including the traditions of Esoteric Buddhism, the 32 major characteristics and 80 minor characteristics are understood to be present in a buddha's sambhogakāya, or reward-body. In contrast, a buddha's physical form is understood to be a nirmāṇakāya, or transformation-body.

Early history

The earliest surviving phase of Buddhist art was generally aniconic, with the Buddha being represented as symbols such as a footprint, an empty chair, a riderless horse, or an umbrella. Later, iconic sculptural traditions were established, with two of the most important being in the regions of Gandhara and Mathura.

The first statues and busts of the Buddha were made in the Gandhara region of modern-day Pakistan and Afghanistan under Indo-Greek influence. Many statues and busts exist where the Buddha and other bodhisattvas have a mustache.

In the Pali Canon a paragraph appears many times recording the Buddha describing how he began his quest for enlightenment, saying:

After examining the cult of the Buddha image in India, Gregory Schopen concludes that followers of Mahāyāna at this time played little to no role in introducing statuary and other physical depictions of the Buddha. Mahāyāna sūtras from this period such as the Maitreyasiṃhanāda Sūtra, only address the image cult as an object of criticism, if it is mentioned at all. Schopen states that followers of Mahāyāna were generally uninterested in worshipping buddhas, but rather in becoming buddhas, and their outlook toward Buddhist practice was "profoundly conservative."

The 32 Signs of a Great Man 

The Buddha is traditionally regarded as having the Thirty-two Characteristics of a Great Man (Skt. mahāpuruṣa lakṣaṇa). These thirty-two characteristics are also regarded as being present in cakravartin kings as well.

The Digha Nikaya, in the "Discourse of the Marks" (Pali: Lakkhaṇa Sutta) (DN 30) enumerates and explains the 32 characteristics. These are also enumerated in the Brahmāyu Sutta of the Majjhima Nikāya (MN 91).

It is generally held, including by Bhikkhu Analayo, that the 32 marks are a later addition. Texts such as the Dona sutta (AN4:36) mention seeing one of the marks in the footprint, but comparative studies do not include the wheel mark itself.

The suttas often state these are recognisable by Brahmins trained in such prognostication of a mahapurisa (a great man) who would be either a Buddha or a wheel-turning monarch. There is no reference to non-Brahmins seeing them; in fact in several places in the Suttas, such as in the Samaññaphala Sutta (DN2), the protagonists could not recognise the Buddha when surrounded by other monks, showing a normality in physical appearance (which would certainly not be the case if the 32 marks were present).

Possessing these marks is therefore seen in these suttas as an expert qualification from Brahmins of the Buddha's authenticity and status, and therefore a converting-tool to the Brahmin orthodoxy. Unfortunately, there does not appear to be any clear connection to Vedic or Vedanta texts that would show this to be the case. More investigation is required to give evidence of the 32 marks as recorded as being sourced from Brahmanical or Vedic tradition.

Since early statues and icons of the Buddha do not seem to have these features, it has been proposed by Bhikkhu Analayo that some may have in fact formed from the stonemason or sculptor, particularly the webbed fingers which would protect the delicate fingers of the statues from damage. The fleshy protuberance of the head likewise originally being just a stylistic representation of a top-knot of hair, a common feature of Indian holy men. 

It is presently speculative whether the statues were later built with the 32 marks in mind, so that should a qualified Brahmin seeing a statue displaying such characteristics, the Brahmin would want to know to whom the statue represents and be interested in Buddhism. It is likewise speculative later Buddhists produced such iconography to reflect the trend from the Lakkhana Sutta as being a genuine necessity, or that they in fact took symbolic representation of the marks as a means of recollection (Buddhanussati). There are no texts or commentaries to suggest these proposals, however future comparative studies may provide esoteric evidence.

The 32 major characteristics are:
Samannāgato ca so bhavaṁ Gotamo dvattiṁsamahāpurisalakkhaṇehi:
The reverend Gotama is endowed with the thirty-two marks of a great man:

1. Suppatiṭṭhitapādo, idam-pi tassa bhoto Gotamassa mahāpurisassa mahāpurisalakkhaṇaṁ bhavati,
1. He has well placed feet, this is, for the great man, the venerable Gotama, a mark of a great man,

2. heṭṭhā ... pādatalesu cakkāni jātāni, sahassārāni sanemikāni sanābhikāni sabbākāraparipūrāni...
2. under the soles of his feet there are wheels, with a thousand rims and naves, complete in every way... 

3. āyatapaṇhi...
3. the heels are long and deep...

4. dīghaṅguli...
4. the fingers are long...

5. mudutalunahatthapādo...
5. the hands and feet are soft and tender…

6. jālahatthapādo...
6. the hands and feet are webbed...

7. ussaṅkhapādo...
7. the ankles are high...

8. eṇijaṅgho...
8. the calves are like an antelope’s...

9. ṭhitako ... anonamanto ubhohi pāṇitalehi jaṇṇukāni parimasati parimajjati...
9. when he stands ... without bending he can rub and stroke both his knees with his hands...

10. kosohitavatthaguyho...
10. what is covered by a cloth is ensheathed...

11. suvaṇṇavaṇṇo ... kañcanasannibhattaco...
11. he is golden in colour, has skin like gold...

12. sukhumacchavi ... sukhumattā chaviyā rajojallaṁ kāye na upalimpati...
12. he has fine skin, and because of the fine skin, dust and dirt to not adhere to him...

13. ekekalomo ... ekekāni lomāni lomakūpesu jātāni...
13. the body-hairs arise singly, each body hair appearing in its own hair follicle...

14. uddhaggalomo ... uddhaggāni lomāni jātāni nīlāni, añjanavaṇṇāni kuṇḍalāvaṭṭāni dakkhiṇāvaṭṭakajātāni...
14. the hair bristles, his bristling hair is black, the colour of collyrium, turning in curls, turning to the right...

15. brahmujugatto...
15. the limbs are straight like brahmā’s...

16. sattussado...
16. there are seven prominent marks...

17. sīhapubbaddhakāyo...
17. the torso is like a lion’s…

18. citantaraṁso...
18. between the shoulders it is firm...

19. nigrodhaparimaṇḍalo, yāvatakvassa kāyo tāvatakvassa byāmo, yāvatakvassa byāmo tāvatakvassa kāyo...
19. the (body) is well-proportioned like a banyan tree, the extent of the arm span equals the extent of the body...

20. samavaṭṭakkhandho...
20. the upper back is even all round,

21. rasaggasaggī...
21. the taste buds are supremely sensitive...

22. sīhahanu...
22. the jaw is like a lion’s...

23. cattālīsadanto...
23. there are forty teeth...

24. samadanto...
24. the teeth are even...

25. aviraḷadanto...
25. the teeth are without gaps...

26. susukkadāṭho...
26. the teeth are very white...

27. pahūtajivho...
27. the tongue is very large...

28. brahmassaro ... karavikabhāṇī...
28. the voice is like brahmā’s or like the sound of the cuckoo...

29. abhinīlanetto...
29.Buddha’s eyes are clear and distinct, the eyes of a Buddha are dark blue like a blue water Lilly, while the Pali tradition simply has that a Buddha’s eyes are dark blue.

30. gopakhumo...
30. the eyelashes are like a cow’s...

31. uṇṇā ... bhamukantare jātā odātā mudutūlasannibhā...
31. the tuft of hair between the eyebrows on his forehead is very white like cotton...

32. uṇhīsasīso, idam-pi tassa bhoto Gotamassa mahāpurisassa mahāpurisalakkhaṇaṁ bhavati.
32. there is a protuberance on the head, this is, for the great man, the venerable Gotama, a mark of a great man.

Dvātiṁsa Mahāpuriṣalakkhaṇāni from Brahmāyusuttaṁ.

The 80 secondary characteristics

The 80 minor characteristics of the Buddha are known to be enumerated a number of times in the extant Āgamas of the Chinese Buddhist canon. According to Guang Xing, the 80 minor marks are related to the 32 major marks, and are merely a more detailed description of the Buddha's bodily features. In the Sarvāstivādin Abhidharma Mahāvibhāṣa Śāstra, the question is posed about the relationship between the major and minor marks, and it is said that the minor marks are among the major marks, but not mixed with them, just as flowers in the forest make the trees distinctive. These 80 minor characteristics became significant as well, as were adopted by Buddhist traditions including both Mahāyāna and Theravāda traditions. In Pali literature, the 80 minor characteristics are found in the Apadāna and the Milindapañha. Some scholars believe the 80 minor characteristics were an early development in the Buddhist tradition, but held as important mostly by the Sarvāstivāda school.

The eighty minor characteristics are:

 He has beautiful fingers and toes.
 He has well-proportioned fingers and toes.
 He has tube-shaped fingers and toes.
 His fingernails and toenails have a rosy tint.
 His fingernails and toenails are slightly upturned at the tip.
 His fingernails and toenails are smooth and rounded without ridges.
 His ankles and wrists are rounded and undented.
 His feet are of equal length.
 He has a beautiful gait, like that of a king-elephant.
 He has a stately gait, like that of a king-lion.
 He has a beautiful gait, like that of a swan.
 He has a majestic gait, like that of a royal ox.
 His right foot leads when walking.
 His knees have no protruding kneecaps.
 He has the demeanor of a great man.
 His navel is without blemish.
 He has a deep-shaped abdomen.
 He has clockwise marks on the abdomen.
 His thighs are rounded like banana sheaves.
 His two arms are shaped like an elephant's trunk.
 The lines on the palms of his hands have a rosy tint.
 His skin is thick or thin as it should be.
 His skin is unwrinkled.
 His body is spotless and without lumps.
 His body is unblemished above and below.
 His body is absolutely free of impurities.
 He has the strength of 1,000 crore elephants or 100,000 crore men.
 He has a protruding nose.
 His nose is well proportioned.
 His upper and lower lips are equal in size and have a rosy tint.
 His teeth are unblemished and with no plaque.
 His teeth are long like polished conches.
 His teeth are smooth and without ridges.
 His five sense-organs are unblemished.
 His four canine teeth are crystal and rounded.
 His face is long and beautiful.
 His cheeks are radiant.
 The lines on his palms are deep.
 The lines on his palms are long.
 The lines on his palms are straight.
 The lines on his palms have a rosy tint.
 His body emanates a halo of light extending around him for two meters.
 His cheek cavities are fully rounded and smooth.
 His eyelids are well proportioned.
 The five nerves of his eyes are unblemished. 
 The tips of his bodily hair are neither curved nor bent.
 He has a rounded tongue.
 His tongue is soft and has a rosy-tint.
 His ears are long like lotus petals.
 His earholes are beautifully rounded.
 His sinews and tendons don't stick out.
 His sinews and tendons are deeply embedded in the flesh.
 His topknot is like a crown.
 His forehead is well-proportioned in length and breadth.
 His forehead is rounded and beautiful.
 His eyebrows are arched like a bow.
 The hair of his eyebrows is fine.
 The hair of his eyebrows lies flat.
 He has large brows.
 His brows reach the outward corner of his eyes.
 His skin is fine throughout his body.
 His whole body has abundant signs of good fortune.
 His body is always radiant.
 His body is always refreshed like a lotus flower.
 His body is exquisitely sensitive to touch.
 His body has the scent of sandalwood.
 His body hair is consistent in length.
 He has fine bodily hair.
 His breath is always fine.
 His mouth always has a beautiful smile.
 His mouth has the scent of a lotus flower.
 His hair has the colour of a dark shadow.
 His hair is strongly scented.
 His hair has the scent of a white lotus.
 He has curled hair.
 His hair does not turn grey.
 He has fine hair.
 His hair is untangled.
 His hair has long curls.
 He has a topknot as if crowned with a royal flower garland.

Causal relations of the 32 signs of perfection of the Tathagata

The Mahayana Mahaparinirvana Sutra expounds the causal relations of the 32 signs of perfection of the Tathagata. These causal relations are cultivated by followers of Mahāyāna Buddhism on their path to buddhahood.

The table below summarizes the causal relations from which each of the 32 signs come about:

Alternate depictions
Some have noted that in at least two discourses in the Pali Canon, the Buddha may be interpreted as being bald as if his head were shaven.

See also
 Gautama Buddha
 Pali Canon & Early Buddhist Texts
 Dhammacakkappavattana Sutta
 Anattalakkhaṇa Sutta
 Samaññaphala Sutta
 Mahaparinibbana Sutta
 Great Renunciation & Four sights
 Relics associated with Buddha
 Leela Attitude
 Māravijaya Attitude
 Meditation Attitude
 Naga Prok Attitude
 Buddhist art
 Halo (religious iconography)
 History of Buddhism

References

Bibliography

Buddhist symbols
Gautama Buddha
Buddhist iconography